The United Nations Development Corporation (UNDC) is a public-benefit corporation in the U.S. state of New York that helps the United Nations with its real estate, office space, and development needs. It was created in 1968. The UNDC is permitted to develop and operate real estate only within a prescribed area (the "Development District") in the vicinity of the United Nations headquarters in Manhattan. The boundaries of the Development District and other powers of the Corporation are subject to change to the extent provided by additional legislation.

Organization

The UNDC has a 14-member board of directors. Its management team is headed by Executive Vice President and General Counsel Robert Cole, who reports to the board. In 2017, the UNDC had operating expenses of $28.05 million, an outstanding debt of $70.11 million, and a level of staffing of 12 people.

Facilities
The UNDC has assisted in developing One UN Plaza, Two UN Plaza, and Three UN Plaza. Three UN Plaza is leased to UNICEF as its world headquarters.

See also 
 Albany Convention Center Authority
 Development Authority of the North Country
 Empire State Development Corporation
 Hudson River Park Trust
 Hugh L. Carey Battery Park City Authority
 New York Convention Center Operating Corporation
 Lower Manhattan Development Corporation
 Municipal Assistance Corporation for the City of NY
 Olympic Regional Development Authority
 State University Construction Fund

References

External links 
 

Public benefit corporations in New York (state)
Companies based in New York City
United Nations properties
1968 establishments in New York (state)